In enzymology, a GTP cyclohydrolase IIa is an enzyme that catalyzes the chemical reaction

GTP + 3 H2O  2-amino-5-formylamino-6-(5-phosphoribosylamino)pyrimidin-4(3H)-one + 2 phosphate

Thus, the two substrates of this enzyme are GTP and H2O, whereas its two products are 2-amino-5-formylamino-6-(5-phosphoribosylamino)pyrimidin-4(3H)-one and phosphate.

This enzyme belongs to the family of hydrolases, those acting on carbon-nitrogen bonds other than peptide bonds, specifically in cyclic amidines.  The systematic name of this enzyme class is GTP 8,9-hydrolase (phosphate-forming).

References

 

EC 3.5.4
Enzymes of unknown structure